Mountain View Cemetery may refer to:

Canada
 Mountain View Cemetery (Vancouver)

United States
 Mountain View Cemetery (Oakland, California)
 Mountain View Cemetery (Columbus, Montana)
 Mountain View Cemetery (Ashland, Oregon)
 Mountain View Cemetery (Oregon City, Oregon)